Boase is a surname. Notable people with the surname include:

 Charles William Boase (1828–1895), British antiquarian
 Elizabeth Boase (born 1963), Australian biblical scholar 
 Frederic Boase (1843–1912), British librarian and biographer
 George Clement Boase (1829–1897), English bibliographer and antiquary
 Henry Boase (1763–1827), English banker and author
 Henry Samuel Boase (1799–1883), Cornish geologist
 T. S. R. Boase (1898–1974), art historian, academic, and Vice-Chancellor of Oxford University
 Tessa Boase, British journalist and author
 Wendy Boase (1944–1999), Australian co-founder of the children's publishing company Walker Books

See also
 Boas (disambiguation)